Gregor Hradetzky (31 January 1909 – 29 December 1984) was an Austrian canoeist and organ builder who competed in the late 1930s.

He was born in Krems an der Donau and died in Bad Kleinkirchheim.

At the 1936 Summer Olympics in Berlin, he won the gold medal in the K-1 1000 metre competition as well as in the folding K-1 10000 metres event. He is only one of two Austrians ever who won two Olympic gold medals in the same Summer Olympic Games (the other is Julius Lenhart).

Hradetzky also won a bronze in the K-1 1000 m event at the 1938 ICF Canoe Sprint World Championships in Vaxholm representing Germany.

References

DatabaseOlympics.com profile

image

Wallechinsky, David and Jaime Loucky (2008). "Canoeing: Men's Kayak Singles 1000 Meters". In The Complete Book of the Olympics: 2008 Edition. London: Aurum Press Limited. p. 471.

1909 births
1984 deaths
Austrian male canoeists
Canoeists at the 1936 Summer Olympics
Olympic canoeists of Austria
Olympic gold medalists for Austria
Olympic medalists in canoeing
ICF Canoe Sprint World Championships medalists in kayak
Medalists at the 1936 Summer Olympics
People from Krems an der Donau
Sportspeople from Lower Austria